"West Ten" is a song by English rapper AJ Tracey and English singer Mabel. It was released as a digital download on 2 July 2020 as the second single off the former's second studio album Flu Game (2021). The song was written by Tracey, Fred, Camille Purcell, Mabel and Take a Daytrip, and is included on the digital & streaming versions of Mabel's debut studio album High Expectations (2019). It was a commercial hit, peaking at number five on the UK Singles Chart and reaching the top of the UK Dance Chart.

Background
Tracey first teased the collaboration by sharing an animated clip of him playing Pac-Man along with an unidentified companion, he said, "Can you guess who this is playing games with me? We just made a banger and wanna share it with you lot." The post was then removed. On 29 June 2020, Mabel shared a screenshot from the AJ Tracey video which included an iMessage from Tracey which reads, "We dropping this tune or what?!" She also tagged Tracey in the accompanying caption. Tracey then replied, "Is it that time?"

Music video
A music video to accompany the release of "West Ten" was first released onto YouTube on 2 July 2020. The music video was directed by Oliver Jennings.

Charts

Weekly charts

Year-end charts

Certifications

Release history

Personnel
Credits adapted from Tidal.
 Fred – producer, writer
 Take a Daytrip – producer, writer
 AJ Tracey – writer
 Kamille – writer
 Mabel – writer
 Jay Reynolds - mixer

References

2020 singles
2020 songs
AJ Tracey songs
Mabel (singer) songs
Songs written by AJ Tracey
Songs written by Mabel (singer)
UK garage songs
Song recordings produced by Take a Daytrip
Songs written by Kamille (musician)
Songs written by Fred Again